Alice is a city in, and the county seat of, Jim Wells County, Texas, United States, in the South Texas region of the state. The population was 19,104 at the 2010 census. Alice was established in 1888. First it was called "Bandana", then "Kleberg", and finally "Alice" after Alice Gertrudis King Kleberg, the daughter of Richard King, who established the King Ranch.

History

Alice originated from the defunct community of Collins,  to the east. c. 1880, the San Antonio and Aransas Pass Railway attempted to build a line through Collins, which then had approximately 2,000 inhabitants. The townspeople were not amenable to selling their land to the railroad company; consequently, the railroad site was moved 3 miles west, and in 1883, a depot called "Bandana" was established at its junction with the Corpus Christi, San Diego and Rio Grande Railway. Bandana soon became a thriving cattle-shipping point, and an application for a post office was made under the name "Kleberg" in honor of Robert Justus Kleberg, a veteran of the Battle of San Jacinto. The petition was denied because a town named Kleberg already appeared on the post office list, so residents then chose the name "Alice", in honor of Alice Gertrudis King Kleberg, Robert Justus Kleberg Jr.’s wife and the daughter of Richard and Henrietta King. The Alice post office opened for business in 1888. Within a few years, the remaining residents of Collins moved to Alice, which was by then a thriving community.

Alice was known for its large cattle industry until the discovery of petroleum beneath and around the town in the 1940s, which caused a slight population boom.

In the 1948 United States Senate election in Texas, an incident (Box 13 scandal) involving Lyndon B. Johnson's bid for the U.S. Senate took place at Alice's Precinct 13, where 202 ballots were cast in alphabetical order and all just at the close of polling in favor of Johnson. Johnson won the election against Coke Stevenson by 87 votes.

Culture
Alice has long been recognized as the "Birthplace of Tejano Music", dating back to the mid-1940s, when Armando Marroquin Sr., of Alice and partner Paco Betancourt of San Benito launched what was to be the first home-based recording company to record Tejano artists exclusively. Ideal Records, which was based in Alice, under the direction of Marroquin became the perfect vehicle for Tejano groups and artists to get their music to the public. Marroquin, who also owned and operated a jukebox company, ensured that Ideal recordings would be distributed throughout South Texas. The songs recorded, which were contributed by Tejano and Mexican composers, became very popular through jukeboxes placed in restaurants, cantinas, or other establishments that would have them, and the then-scarce Spanish-language radio programs. In addition to Ideal, Alice was the home of Freddie Records and Hacienda Records, which were dominant players in Tejano music in the 1970s and 1980s.

Alice is the birthplace of two Nobel Prize winners. Robert F. Curl Jr. was honored with a Nobel Prize in chemistry in 1996, and James P. Allison won a Nobel for his work in medicine in 2018.

Geography

Alice is located in central Jim Wells County at  (27.750652, –98.070460). Alice falls within the boundaries of South Texas and the Texas Coastal Bend region.

U.S. Route 281 passes just west of the city limits on a bypass. The highway leads north  to George West and south  to Falfurrias. Texas State Highway 44 passes through the center of town as Front Street and leads east  to Robstown and west  to Freer. Texas State Highway 359 joins SH 44 through the center of Alice, but leads northeast  to Mathis and southwest  to Hebbronville.

The nearest metropolitan areas are Corpus Christi,  to the east, and Laredo,  to the west.

Climate
 Annual average temperature: 
 January average temperature: 
 July average temperature: 
 Average annual rainfall: 30.13 inches
 Wettest month: September (5.52 inches)
 Driest month: March (0.94 inches)
 Growing season: 289 days
 The last snowfall was December 8, 2017. 
  was the highest temperature ever recorded in the city.
  was the lowest temperature ever recorded in the city.
 Alice has very little seismic activity, with only two small earthquakes happening in recent history—a 3.8-magnitude quake on March 24, 1997, and a 4.0-magnitude quake on April 24, 2010.

The data below are from the Western Regional Climate Center, recorded over the period from 1893 to 2008.

Demographics

2020 census

As of the 2020 United States census, there were 17,891 people, 6,129 households, and 4,362 families residing in the city.

2000 census
At the 2000 census,  19,010 people, 6,400 households and 4,915 families resided in the city. The population density was 1,597.4 per square mile (616.8/km2). The 6,998 housing units averaged 588.0 per square mile (227.1/km2). The racial makeup of the city was 77.44% White, 0.86% African American, 0.53% Native American, 0.75% Asian, 18.07% from other races, and 2.41% from two or more races. Hispanics or Latinos of any race were 78.05% of the population.

Of the 6,400 households, 39.0% had children under the age of 18 living with them, 54.5% were married couples living together, 17.6% had a female householder with no husband present, and 23.2% were not families. About 20.9% of all households were made up of individuals, and 10.8% had someone living alone who was 65 years of age or older. The average household size was 2.92 and the average family size was 3.39.

Age distribution was 30.3% under the age of 18, 9.3% from 18 to 24, 26.2% from 25 to 44, 20.5% from 45 to 64, and 13.7% 65 years of age or older. The median age was 33 years. For every 100 females, there were 91.0 males. For every 100 females age 18 and over, there were 85.8 males.

The median household income was $30,365, and the median family income was $34,276. Males had a median income of $32,409 versus $17,101 for females. The per capita income for the city was $13,118. About 17.9% of families and 21.9% of the population were below the poverty line, including 28.4% of those under age 18 and 20.2% of those age 65 or over.

Economy

Today, Alice's economy is centered on the oil industry, with more than 100 different oil field companies located around the Alice area. Alice is called the "Hub City" due to its geographical location between Corpus Christi, McAllen, Laredo, and San Antonio. Its location between these cities makes it an ideal center for distribution.
Some major oil companies in Alice are Schlumberger, Halliburton and Alice serves as the headquarters for Dixie Iron Works - MSI.
, Alice has an unemployment rate of 6.30% when the U.S. average was 8.50%.

Transportation

Highways
  U.S. Highway 281
  Interstate 69C – I-69C will be concurrent with U.S. Highway 281.
  State Highway 44
  State Highway 359
  FM 665

Air travel
 Alice International Airport – general-aviation airport with no scheduled service

Railways
 Texas Mexican Railway – now owned by Kansas City Southern, which connects Monterrey, Mexico, via Laredo, to the Port of Corpus Christi

Education
The city is served by the Alice Independent School District.

Higher education
 Coastal Bend College provides vocational and academic courses for certification or associate degrees. The college also works with local businesses and industry to customize training and education classes for employees.

Public

High school – grades 9–12 – Alice High School

Junior high – grades 6–8 – William Adams Middle School

Elementary schools – grades K–5 – Dubose, Noonan, Saenz, and Schallert

Private

 St. Elizabeth School, grades Pre-K3–6
 St. Joseph School, grades PreK3–9 (Now closed)
 Alice Christian School, grades K–12
 Agape House, grades PreK–12
 Alice Migrant Head Start

Notable people

 James P. Allison, immunologist, winner of the 2018 Nobel Prize in Physiology or Medicine, the Lasker Prize, and the Breakthrough Prize for his development of cancer immunotherapy
 Chris Brazzell, Canadian Football League player and ex NFL player, born May 22, 1976, and played on the Alice High School football team: He was drafted to the NFL in 1998 to the New York Jets as the 174th overall pick in the sixth round
 Marv Brown, NFL player with the Detroit Lions in 1957
 Sonny Brown, Houston Oiler, MVP of the 1985 Orange Bowl that earned his team the Oklahoma Sooners a national championship; graduated from Alice High in 1982 where he was 2nd-team all-state quarterback
 Lois Chiles, born April 15, 1947, top 1970s fashion model and actress, most famous for her role as Bond girl Holly Goodhead in Moonraker
 John Donald Wesley Corley (born 1951 and Alice High School graduate of 1969), retired four-star general in the United States Air Force
 Robert F. Curl Jr., Nobel Prize winner, born on August 23, 1933, in Alice; emeritus professor of chemistry at Rice University. He was awarded the Nobel Prize in Chemistry in 1996 for the discovery of fullerene (with the late Richard Smalley, also of Rice University, and Harold Kroto of the University of Sussex)
 J. Frank Dobie, award-winning author who taught at UT Austin, moved to Alice at 16 until he graduated from WAHS
 Bill Henry, Major League Baseball pitcher from 1952 to 1969; played on six clubs including the Houston Astros and Boston Red Sox
 Bill Mason, journalist murdered in 1949 after exposing corruption in local law enforcement
Richard Raymond, born in Alice on October 27, 1960; Democratic member of the Texas House of Representatives currently representing District 42, which encompasses western Webb County and includes most of the city of Laredo
 Brigadier General Angela Salinas, commanding general of the Marine Corps Recruit Depot San Diego: She assumed command on August 4, 2006, becoming the first woman to command the Recruit Depot
 Raul G. Salinas, former mayor of Laredo, born in Alice on November 8, 1947
 Brothers Jim and Wayne Tyrone, both born in Alice; Major League Baseball outfielders
 Reality Winner (born 1991), American intelligence specialist pled guilty to felony transmission of national defense information.
 Larry T. Beasley, President and CEO of The Washington Times, newspaper, 2012–present

Outdoors
Alice and its surrounding areas have an abundance of wildlife, so hunting, fishing, and bird watching are favorite activities, and wild game hunting leases are available through Texas Parks and Wildlife. Golfers have two courses from which to choose in the Hub City, with the Alice Municipal Golf Course being the larger with 18 holes, long fairways, and water hazards. The other is the 9-hole Alice Country Club golf course east of town.

References

External links

 City of Alice official website

 
1883 establishments in Texas
Cities in Texas
Cities in Jim Wells County, Texas
County seats in Texas
Micropolitan areas of Texas
Populated places established in 1883